The Simonini Victor 2 is an Italian aircraft engine, designed and produced by Simonini Racing of San Dalmazio di Serramazzoni for use in ultralight aircraft.

Design and development
The Victor 2 is a twin cylinder, in-line, two-stroke, liquid-cooled, gasoline engine design, with a mechanical gearbox reduction drive with reduction ratios of 2.54:1 to 4.00:1. It employs  dual capacitor discharge ignition and produces  at 6200 rpm.

Specifications

See also

References

External links

Simonini aircraft engines
Two-stroke aircraft piston engines